Westlake High School may refer to:

Westlake High School (California), Westlake Village, California
Westlake High School (Georgia), Atlanta, Georgia
Westlake High School (Louisiana), Westlake, Louisiana
Westlake High School (Maryland), Waldorf, Maryland
Westlake High School (New York), Thornwood, New York
Westlake High School (Ohio), Westlake, Ohio
Westlake High School (Texas), near West Lake Hills, Texas
Westlake High School (Utah), Saratoga Springs, Utah
Harvard-Westlake School, Los Angeles, California